The MF 67 is a fleet of steel-wheel electric multiple unit trains for the Paris Métro. The first MF 67 trains entered service on Line 3 in June 1968, and became one of the biggest orders for the Métro, with 1,482 cars constructed. The need to replace the Sprague-Thomson fleet, as well as increasing costs associated with the later-cancelled plan to introduce rubber-tyred trains on all Métro lines, were the main factors for the size of the order.

At its peak, during the late-1980s and the early-1990s, the MF 67 operated on eight of the (then) fifteen Métro lines (Lines 2, 3 and 3bis, 5, 7bis, 9, 10 and 12): the MF 67 also operated on Lines 7, 8 and 13 (including the old Line 14), all before the introduction of the MF 77 in 1978.

Many of the MF 67 trains have been removed from service: throughout 1994, the MF 88 displaced the MF 67 from Line 7bis, and from 2008 to 2016, the MF 01 replaced the MF 67 on Lines 2, 5, and 9. The MF 67 remains in service on Lines 3, 3bis, 10 and 12, where the Île-de-France Mobilités intends to replace the remaining MF 67 trains with new trains provisionally known as the MF 19 (fr).

Conception
It was originally envisioned by the RATP to convert all Metro lines to rubber-tyred pneumatic operation. However, this plan was later abandoned due to high costs, which in turn, would have prolonged the service of the aging Sprague-Thomson trainsets to 80 years. Therefore, a new class of steel-wheel rolling stock was developed. During the development phase, the MF 67 was known as the MF 65.

Series
The MF 67 actually comprises seven different series; however, two series of these trains were prototypes.

Series A (Converted to MF67D): 200 cars (40 trains) were delivered to Lines 3 and 9 between 1967–1969
One train in this series was the Zébulon, a stainless-steel prototype that saw intermittent passenger service, last of which was on Line 9. It was used as a training train for many years, until it succumbed to heavy vandalism in 2010. All cars except for one driving car were scrapped as of 2011.
Series B (Converted to MF67A then MF67D): 6 cars were delivered in 1968 as prototype trains that never saw commercial service. Converted back to MF67A. 
Series C (Converted to MF67D): 340 cars (68 trains) delivered to Lines 3 and 7 between 1972 and 1975.
Series CX (Converted to MF67D): 16 prototype cars that were fitted with "plug" type door openers, similar to that of the MF 77. These ran on Line 9. Converted back to normal MF67 doors and used as part of MF67D sets
Series D: 363 new trailer cars mixed with former MF67A and MF67C motor cars that were originally deployed to Lines 3, 5, and 9 between 1973 and 1975. They now operate on Lines 3, 3bis, 10, and 12.
Series E (now retired): 56 trains that were originally deployed to Lines 2, 7bis, and 8 between 1974 and 1976. Many trains were replaced by the MF 01 cars between 2009 and 2011, though some were displaced much earlier by the MF 88 cars to Line 10. The trains operating on Line 10 were retired between 2014 and 2016. Five trains were retained for training in the USFRT tunnel, replacing the Zebulon, but they were retired in 2017.
Series F (now retired): 51 trains that were originally deployed to Lines 7 and 13 between 1975 and 1978. They were redeployed to Line 5. Despite being the youngest series, they have suffered from excessive wear and tear, as well as weather impacts sustained from being stored in the outdoor Bobigny depot. They were replaced by the MF 01 cars between 2011 and 2013.

Technical specifications
 Train-sets delivered: 297 (1482 cars including 9 in reserve)
 Configuration: M+R+M+R+M (except 3bis M+R+M)
 Length:  (all motor coach),  (trailers)
 Maximum width: 
 Braking: rheostatic brake and electric brake on the series E and F
 Bogies: single or twin with pneumatic suspension on the series E and F
 Maximum speed: 
 Authorized speed: 
 Doors: 4 doors by vis-à-vis manual opening, opening of 
 Air-conditioning: None

Service trains
Currently, the RATP uses a string of MF-67 "Auteuil Convoy" trains (retired MF 67C trainsets from Line 2 in four car compositions), to supply the Auteuil and Vaugirard Depots, these trains are colored yellow and brown and serve as auxiliary equipment of the work of the RATP (VMI). They replaced the aging tractor variants of the Sprague-Thomson.

Formations

Current trainset

Line 3

Line 3Bis

Line 10

Line 12

Former trainset

Before 1971
During the first few years of operation, the MF67s (A and C) were "full grip". All cars were motorized to maintain efficient speed and acceleration against the Mp59 (with tires).

the order of cars (not motorized) made it possible to create the Mf67 D by withdrawing 2 motor cars and replacing them by two cars. In the end all the Mf67D are transformed Mf 67 A or C.

Line 7Bis
Until 1994, with the arrival of the MF 88, line 7 bis used MF67E in a trainset of 4 cars.

These trainsets arrived in 1981-82 from lines 8 and 13 (which received new MF77), will leave from the 7bis line in 1994 for line 10 (which reformed the old MA51)

Information:

AC : Air compressor
RS : Resistor Control
M : end power car with driver's cab
N : power car without driver's cab
S :  end car with driver's cab
NA : power car without driver's cab and with first class (not use today)
A : car with first class
B : car only second class

Gallery

References

The information in this article is based on that in its French equivalent

External links

MF 1967
Electric multiple units of France
750 V DC multiple units